Carolinites is a genus of trilobite, assigned to the Telephinidae family, that occurs during the Lower and Middle Ordovician. Carolinites had a pantropical distribution, and there is evidence that it lived in upper parts of the water column.  The free cheeks of Carolinites are largely covered by its huge eyes, except for the attachment of large genal spines that extend downward, backward and lateral and gradually curving further backward. The glabella is slightly bulbous, the occipital ring is well defined, but further transglabellar furrows are lacking. The thorax has 10 segments. The axis of the pygidium is highly vaulted, with a curved spine emerging almost perpendicular to the midline and ending parallel to it and a node on each of the other three segments. Carolinites is known from what are today Australia (Tasmania), Canada (Alberta), China, France, Spitsbergen, and the United States (Utah).

Etymology 
Carolinites has been named after Caroline Creek in Tasmania, the type locality of C. bulbosa.

Species 
 C. bulbosa Kobayashi, 1940 (type) 
 C. genacinaca Ross, 1951
 C. genacinaca genacinaca
 C. genacinaca nevadensis Hintze, 1953
 C. killaryensis Stubblefield, 1950 synonym Dimastocephalus killaryensis
 C. sibericus Chugaeva, 1964 synonym C. angustagena

Distribution 
 C. genacinaca occurs in the Ordovician of the United States (Utah, Nevada), East Greenland, East Siberia, Novaya Zemlya, Arctic Canada and Svalbard.
 C. killaryensis was found in the Ordovician of Western Ireland, Svalbard and the Western United States (Basin Ranges).
 C. sibericus has been recorded from the Ordovician of Western Ireland, Siberia, Svalbard and the Western United States.

References 

Proetida genera
Fossils of Canada
Fossils of China
Fossils of France
Fossils of Svalbard
Fossils of the United States
Ordovician trilobites of Asia
Ordovician trilobites of Europe
Ordovician trilobites of Australia
Ordovician trilobites of North America
Early Ordovician first appearances
Middle Ordovician extinctions
Paleozoic life of Alberta
Paleozoic life of Newfoundland and Labrador
Paleozoic life of the Northwest Territories
Pantropical fauna